Neil McGregor is an Australian born film maker who worked extensively in Vancouver, Canada.

Biography
McGregor graduated from the Australian Film, Television & Radio School and  Griffith University with high distinctions. While at University, his films were shortlisted for the Tropfest Film Festival and opened the Brisbane International Film Festival. He remains one of the youngest people to be inducted into the Australian Directors Guild and came to the attention of Film Production Companies, Australian funding organisations and Advertising Agencies with his 'Doritos Make you Own Ad Competition' featuring a Michael Jackson Thriller inspired commercial.

His directorial debut feature-length film The Little Things (2010) was funded by Screen Australia, Screen Queensland. The Little Thing'''s Australian premiere screened to a sold out cinema at the Gold Coast International Film Festival [1] and won best feature film at the Maryland International Film Festival by the judging panel headed by American filmmaker Joe Carnahan.[2] The film also won Best Feature Film at the Toronto International Film Awards and the following year he was included as part of the festivals judging panel.

On the back of the success of The Little Things, McGregor relocated to Vancouver, Canada where he was added to the directing roster for TV commercials across North America. While developing a slate of projects, he also worked in Locations and Assistant Director Departments where he informally shadowed several directors on various films including Godzilla, The Interview, Fifty Shades of Grey and secured a literary agent before moving back to Australia. On arrival, McGregor commenced as vice president, Locations & Production Attraction at Screen Queensland.

As part of the team at Screen Queensland, McGregor played an integral role in helping attract significant in production investment into Australia with films such as Aquaman, Thor: Ragnarok, Pacific Rim: Uprising, Godzilla Vs Kong, The Shallows, Danger Close, Tidelands and many others. Due to the increased amount of film production activity in Queensland, McGregor conceptualised a design and oversaw the build process of what would become Screen Queensland Studios. Paramount Pictures was the first production to use the studio and is a legacy for the future of the Australian film industry

 Filmography 
 Feature Length 
 The Little Things (2010) Director
 Dreamer (2012) Director

 Television 
 The Brisbane Bard (2011) Director
 "Share House" (2012) Series Director

 Short Film 
 "People Watching" (2011) Director
 Fortune Faded (2009) Writer / Director / Producer
 Out Of Sorts'' (2006) Writer / Director / Producer

Accolades
'The Little Things'
Toronto International Film & Video Awards AWARD WINNER Best Feature Film
Maryland International Film Festival AWARD WINNER Best Feature Film
Alaska International Film Awards GRAND JURY AWARD WINNER Best Feature Film
The Accolade Competition AWARD WINNER Best Feature Film
American International Film Festival AWARD WINNER Best Dramatic Feature
American International Film Festival AWARD WINNER Best Actor
American International Film Festival AWARD WINNER Best Actress
American International Film Festival AWARD WINNER Most Promising New Actor
American International Film Festival AWARD WINNER Most Promising New Actress
Melbourne Underground Film Festival NOMINATION Best Actor
Melbourne Underground Film Festival AWARD Best Director

Festival Screenings
'The Little Things'
The Stepping Stone Film Festival OFFICIAL SELECTION
Toronto International Film & Video Awards OFFICIAL SELECTION
Maryland Film Festival OFFICIAL SELECTION
Lucerne International Film Festival OFFICIAL SELECTION
Melbourne Underground Film Festival OFFICIAL SELECTION
Columbia Gorge International Film Festival OFFICIAL SELECTION
American International Film Festival OFFICIAL SELECTION
Gold Coast International Film Festival OFFICIAL SELECTION
The Accolade Competition OFFICIAL SELECTION

'Fortune Faded'
Tropfest

'Out Of Sorts'
Brisbane International Film Festival OFFICIAL SELECTION  (Opening Film)

References 

www.neilmcgregor.com.au http://www.badlit.com/?p=18181

Living people
Australian film directors
People from Brisbane
Year of birth missing (living people)
Australian emigrants to Canada